Madrid Half Marathon is an annual half marathon arranged in Madrid, Spain. Organised by the Marathon Sports Association, it is held at the beginning of April and in 2012 it attracted more than 13,000 runners .

The 2020 edition of the race was postponed to 2020.10.04 due to the coronavirus pandemic, with all registered runners given the option to defer the registration to either 2021 or 2022 at no extra cost.

List of winners

Wins by country

References

External links
 Town hall reference info (in English)
 Official Site (in Spanish)

Half marathons